Lepidoblepharis ruthveni is a species of gecko, a lizard in the family Sphaerodactylidae. The species is endemic to northwestern South America.

Etymology
The specific name, ruthveni, is in honor of American herpetologist Alexander Grant Ruthven.

Geographic range
L. ruthveni is found in Colombia and Ecuador.

Habitat
The preferred natural habitat of L. ruthveni is forest.

Reproduction
L. ruthveni is oviparous.

References

Further reading
Parker HW (1926). "The Neotropical Lizards of the Genera Lepidoblepharis, Pseudogonatodes, Lanthrogecko, and Sphaerodactylus, with the Description of a new Genus". Annals and Magazine of Natural History, Ninth Series 17: 291–301. (Lepidoblepharis ruthveni, new species, p. 295).
Rösler H (2000). "Kommentierte Liste der rezent, subrezent und fossil bekannten Geckotaxa (Reptilia: Gekkonomorpha) ". Gekkota 2: 28–153. (Lepidoblepharis ruthveni, p. 90). (in German).

Lepidoblepharis
Reptiles described in 1926